A by-election for the constituency of Stirling and Falkirk in the House of Commons was held on 7 October 1948, caused by the death of the incumbent Labour MP Joseph Westwood. The result was a hold for the Labour Party, with their candidate Malcolm MacPherson.

Result

Previous election

References

 Craig, F. W. S. (1983) [1969]. British parliamentary election results 1918-1949 (3rd edition ed.). Chichester: Parliamentary Research Services. . 
 

Stirling and Falkirk by-election
Stirling and Falkirk by-election
Stirling and Falkirk by-election, 1948
Stirling and Falkirk by-election
Politics of Stirling (council area)
Politics of Falkirk (council area)
By-elections to the Parliament of the United Kingdom in Scottish constituencies